Humberto de Jesús Hernández Caro (born June 1, 1971) is a Colombian retired road cyclist from Risaralda, Caldas. He was nicknamed El Erizo ("the hedgehog") during his career.

External links
 pedalear
 

1971 births
Living people
Colombian male cyclists
People from Caldas Department
20th-century Colombian people